Massachusetts House of Representatives' 6th Middlesex district in the United States is one of 160 legislative districts included in the lower house of the Massachusetts General Court. It covers part of the city of Framingham in Middlesex County. Democrat Priscila Sousa of Framingham has represented the district since 2023.

The current district geographic boundary overlaps with that of the Massachusetts Senate's 2nd Middlesex and Norfolk district.

Representatives
 Moses Proctor, circa 1858
 Oliver R. Clark, circa 1859
 Francis H. Raymond, circa 1888
 William J. Naphen, circa 1920
 H. Edward Snow, circa 1951
 Vincent Joseph Piro, circa 1975
Barbara Gray, 1979 – 1996
John H. Stasik, 1997 – 2000
 Deborah D. Blumer, 2001 – 2006
 Pam Richardson, 2007-2011
 Chris Walsh, 2010 – 2018
 Maria D. Robinson, 2019 – 2022
 Priscila Sousa, 2023 – current

Former locales
The district previously covered:
 West Cambridge, circa 1872
 Winchester, circa 1872

See also
 List of Massachusetts House of Representatives elections
 Other Middlesex County districts of the Massachusetts House of Representatives: 1st, 2nd, 3rd, 4th, 5th, 7th, 8th, 9th, 10th, 11th, 12th, 13th, 14th, 15th, 16th, 17th, 18th, 19th, 20th, 21st, 22nd, 23rd, 24th, 25th, 26th, 27th, 28th, 29th, 30th, 31st, 32nd, 33rd, 34th, 35th, 36th, 37th
 List of Massachusetts General Courts
 List of former districts of the Massachusetts House of Representatives

Images
Portraits of legislators

References

External links
 Ballotpedia
  (State House district information based on U.S. Census Bureau's American Community Survey).
 League of Women Voters of Framingham

House
Government of Middlesex County, Massachusetts